Edward Julian Nally (1859 – 1953) was a U.S. radio industrialist. Nally served as the vice president and general manager of American Marconi Company and was the first president of RCA between 1919 and 1923.

References

See also
 David Sarnoff

1859 births
1953 deaths
American manufacturing businesspeople
American music industry executives
American radio personalities
19th-century American businesspeople